This is the list of governors of the Brazilian state of Rondônia.

References 

Rondonia
Governors of Rondônia